North Lake Correctional Facility is a privately owned medium- and maximum-security prison for men located in Baldwin, Lake County, Michigan, operated by GEO Group under contract for the Michigan Department of Corrections. Current capacity of the facility is 1741 inmates.

The prison was originally built in 1999 by Wackenhut to house Michigan’s youth offenders. The GEO Group, Wackenhut's successor firm, expanded the prison from 500 to 1,700 beds in the late 2000s.  Some 280 high security inmates convicted of crimes in the state of Vermont arrived from other out-of-state prisons (in Arizona and Kentucky) to the Baldwin facility in June 2015.  County Commissioner Dan Sloan stated that as many as 150 jobs would result from the influx of out-of-state prisoners to the facility. 

Vermont received notice that GEO is terminating its contract effective June 2017; Vermont Corrections will relocate the prisoners from the Baldwin facility.

References

Prisons in Michigan
Buildings and structures in Lake County, Michigan
GEO Group
1999 establishments in Michigan